The Norwegian Media Businesses' Association (MBL) is an employers' organisation in Norway, organized under the national Confederation of Norwegian Enterprise.

The current CEO is Arvid Sand. Chairman of the board is Ivar Rusdal.

References

External links
Official site

Employers' organisations in Norway